Lease Corporation International is a company based in Dublin, Ireland, which offers a wide range of aircraft leasing to various airlines. LCI is a subsidiary of Libra Group, which is headed by George Logothetis.

Lease Corporation International was founded in 2004. The subsidiary leases fixed-wing aircraft to airlines in Europe and Asia, including Singapore Airlines, British Airways, Virgin Atlantic, Oman Air, and Hong Kong Express Airways. After selling its fleet of aircraft in 2007, LCI purchased new aircraft in 2009. In 2012, LCI expanded into helicopter leasing. Helicopters leased by LCI are used by offshore oil operations, and for search and rescue as well as emergency medical services. LCI offices are located in Ireland, the United Kingdom, and Singapore.

Fleet 
, the LCI fleet consists of the following types of aircraft:
Helicopters
Airbus H175
Airbus H130
Leonardo AW139
Leonardo AW169
Leonardo AW189
Sikorsky S-76C

Airplanes
Boeing 747-400F
Bombardier CS100
Bombardier CS300

References 

Aircraft leasing companies of the Republic of Ireland
2004 establishments in Ireland
Transport companies established in 2004